Mawle is a surname. Notable people with the surname include:

Henry Mawle (1871–1943), British cricketer
Joseph Mawle (born 1974), British actor
Norman Mawle (1897–1971), British World War I flying ace

See also
Male (surname)
Mawe (disambiguation)
Pawle